The Bristol and District Rugby Football Combination is an organisation for the promotion of junior rugby union in the city of Bristol, England.

The Bristol and District Rugby Football Combination is one of two pillars on which the rugby union heritage of Bristol is based - the other being the city's senior rugby club the Bristol Bears. The Bristol Combination, on the other hand, is the body which nurtures junior rugby in the city.  From its ranks have come many great players, but also it has provided the framework within which rugby as recreation is developed for thousands of people.

The Bristol Combination was founded in 1901 for "the promotion of rugby union and the mutual well being of clubs", tasks which remain at the core of its mission today.  Its members are those 53 rugby clubs of Bristol and its surrounding area, which includes North Somerset and South Gloucestershire.  No comparable body of a similar size exists in England.

As well as its representative role, the Combination organises the Charles Saunders Combination Cup, merit tables and leagues for clubs and teams not participating in RFU competitions, as well as an important role in youth and rugby development. It is also responsible for a ground where several clubs play at Lockleaze, in the north of the city.

The Combination regularly organises fixtures of the area's best players against Bristol Rugby Club's first team, or its second team, Bristol United.

Constituent Clubs

Abbey Wood
Aretians
Ashley Down Old Boys
Avon
 Avonmouth Old Boys
Barton Hill
Bishopston
Blagdon
Bristol Bears (honorary member)
Bristol Aeroplance Corporation
Bristol Barbarians
Bristol Harlequins
 Bristol Ladies
Bristol Saracens
Broad Plain
Bristol Telephone Area
Chew Valley
 Chippenham
Chipping Sodbury
Cleve
Clevedon
 Clifton
 Cotham Park
 Dings Crusaders
 Frampton Cotterell
Gordano
 Hornets
Imperial
Keynsham
Kingswood
HMP Leyhill
Midsomer Norton
Nailsea & Backwell
North Bristol
Old Ashtonians
 Old Bristolians
 Old Colstonians
Old Elizabethans
 Old Redcliffians
Oldfield Old Boys
Pilning
St. Bernadette Old Boys
St. Brendans Old Boys
St Mary's Old Boys
Southmead
The Tor
Thornbury
United Bristol Hospitals
University of Bristol
University of the West of England
Walcot Old Boys
Wells
 Weston-Super-Mare
Whitehall
Winscombe
Yatton

Yate RFC

Competitions 

The Bristol and District Rugby Football Combination currently runs the following cup competitions for clubs in Bristol and the surrounding area:

 Bristol Combination Cup (club sides at tiers 4-6 of the English rugby union system)
 Bristol Combination Vase (tiers 7–8)
 Bristol Combination Cyril Parsons Bowl (tiers 9–11)

See also 
 Gloucestershire RFU
 North Gloucestershire Combination
 English rugby union system
 History of the English rugby union system

References

External links
 Bristol Combination Official Website

Rugby union governing bodies in England
Rugby union in Bristol
Sports organizations established in 1901
Rugby union in Gloucestershire
Rugby union in Somerset